Artocarpus glaucus is a  tropical species of tree in the family Moraceae. Found in Indonesia, Malaysia and Australia.

References

glaucus
Flora of Malesia
Flora of the Northern Territory
Plants described in 1825